LEZ may refer to:
 Lima Enerzone Corporation
 Low emission zone
 IATA code for La Esperanza Airport in La Esperanza, Honduras

Lez may refer to:
 Derogatory word for lesbian (more commonly les)
 Lez, Haute-Garonne, a former commune in the Haute-Garonne department in France
 Lez (river), a river in the Hérault department in France, discharging into the Mediterranean Sea
 Lez (Rhône), a river in the Drôme and Vaucluse departments in France, tributary of the Rhône
 Lez (Salat), a river in the Ariège department in France, tributary of the Salat
 Lez Duly, former member of punk band Concrete Sox
 ISO 639 code for Lezgian languagelez=lehze

See also
 Lèze, a river in the Ariège and Haute-Garonne departments in southwestern France